Aminabad (also Romanized as Amīnābād) is a village in Mehmandust Rural District, Kuraim District, Nir County, Ardabil Province, Iran. At the 2006 census, its population was 132, in 33 families.

References 

Towns and villages in Nir County